Lieutenant-Colonel Sir Henry Baldwin Barton (1869 - 24 June 1952) was a British Army officer and eight-times mayor of the Metropolitan Borough of Finsbury (1911–21). Barton was the son of Henry Barton of 9 Lordship Lane, Wood Green, London. He married in 1892, Fannie, daughter of George Revell of Kensington. They had three sons and one daughter. He was knighted in 1921.

References 

1869 births
1952 deaths
Mayors of places in Greater London
People from Wood Green
London Regiment officers
English knights
Knights Bachelor